The Capela de Nossa Senhora das Salvas is a chapel in Sines Municipality, Setúbal District, Portugal. It is classified as a national monument.

References

Buildings and structures in Setúbal District
Roman Catholic chapels in Portugal
National monuments in Setúbal District
Buildings and structures in Sines